Garvin County is a county in south-central Oklahoma, United States. As of the 2010 census, the population was 27,576. Its county seat is Pauls Valley. In 1906, delegates to Constitution Convention formed Garvin County from part of the Chickasaw Nation, Indian Territory. The county was named for Samuel J. Garvin, a local Chickasaw rancher, merchant and banker. Its economy is largely based on farming, ranching and oil production.

History
Garvin County came into existence on November 16, 1907, the day Oklahoma became a state.  The territory within the present-day county had been a part of Pickens County, Chickasaw Nation in the Indian Territory.

An election held June 20, 1908, resulted in county citizens choosing Pauls Valley as the county seat over the towns of Wynnewood and Elmore City.

Oil was discovered in the southwestern part of the county known as Robberson Field in the 1920s. The Golden Trend pool, which ran from the northwest to the southern parts of the county developed later.

Geography
The county lies between the Red Bed plains and the Sandstone Hills physiographic regions. The main waterways are the Washita River, Rush Creek and Wildhorse Creek.

Major highways
  Interstate 35
  U.S. Highway 77
  U.S. Highway 177
  State Highway 7
  State Highway 19
  State Highway 29
  State Highway 145

Adjacent counties
 McClain County (north)
 Pontotoc County (east)
 Murray County (southeast)
 Carter County (south)
 Stephens County (southwest)
 Grady County (northwest)

Demographics

As of the census of 2000, there were 27,210 people, 10,865 households, and 7,605 families residing in the county.  The population density was 34 people per square mile (13/km2).  There were 12,641 housing units at an average density of 16 per square mile (6/km2).  The racial makeup of the county was 84.93% White, 2.55% Black or African American, 7.36% Native American, 0.23% Asian, 0.04% Pacific Islander, 1.54% from other races, and 3.34% from two or more races.  3.40% of the population were Hispanic or Latino of any race.

There were 10,865 households, out of which 30.70% had children under the age of 18 living with them, 56.40% were married couples living together, 10.10% had a female householder with no husband present, and 30.00% were non-families. 26.90% of all households were made up of individuals, and 14.30% had someone living alone who was 65 years of age or older.  The average household size was 2.45 and the average family size was 2.96.

In the county, the population was spread out, with 24.80% under the age of 18, 8.10% from 18 to 24, 26.00% from 25 to 44, 23.10% from 45 to 64, and 17.90% who were 65 years of age or older.  The median age was 39 years. For every 100 females there were 92.70 males.  For every 100 females age 18 and over, there were 88.80 males.

The median income for a household in the county was $28,070, and the median income for a family was $34,774. Males had a median income of $28,033 versus $18,940 for females. The per capita income for the county was $14,856.  About 11.40% of families and 15.90% of the population were below the poverty line, including 18.60% of those under age 18 and 14.30% of those age 65 or over.

Politics

Economy
While oil and gas production are important to the county economy, agriculture has been the major industry for employment since statehood. In 1907 crops of alfalfa, broomcorn, cotton, onions, potatoes, and hay produced in the county were valued at $2.5 million. By the 1930s over  had been planted with paper shelled pecan trees.  By 1961 the Lindsay area harvested more broomcorn than any other region in the world, and the county slogan became "We sweep the world."

Communities

 Antioch
 Elmore City
 Erin Springs
 Fort Arbuckle
 Foster
 Hennepin
 Hoover
 Katie
 Lindsay
 Maysville
 Paoli
 Pauls Valley (county seat)
 Pernell
 Purdy
 Stratford
 Tussy
 Wallville
 Wynnewood

See also
 National Register of Historic Places listings in Garvin County, Oklahoma

References

External links
 Encyclopedia of Oklahoma History and Culture - Garvin County
 Oklahoma Digital Maps: Digital Collections of Oklahoma and Indian Territory
 Garvin County Sheriff's Office

 
1906 establishments in Indian Territory
Populated places established in 1906